Soy El Mismo (English: "I'm the Same") is the third studio album by American singer Prince Royce. The album was released on October 8, 2013, by Sony Music Latin and became Royce's third number 1 on the Billboard Top Latin Albums chart in the United States. With Soy el Mismo, Royce also reached a career-best peak of number 14 on the US Billboard 200.

The album was preceded by the release of its lead single, "Darte un Beso", on July 15, 2013. The single became Royce's fourth to reach number-one on the Billboard Hot Latin Songs chart in the United States. "Darte un Beso" also reached number-one on multiple Latin music sub-charts in the US and was certified 3× Platinum (Latin) by the Recording Industry Association of America (RIAA). Four other singles were released to promote the album between 2014 and 2015: "Te Robaré", "Nada", the title track, and "Solita". The track "Te Regalo el Mar" was made available as an instant digital download with the iTunes Store pre-order of the album.

At the Latin Grammy Awards of 2014, the album received a nomination for Best Contemporary Tropical Album, Royce's second career nomination in the category. Royce was then nominated for three awards at the 2014 Billboard Music Awards: Top Latin Artist, Top Latin Album, and Top Latin Song for "Darte un Beso". The latter won the award for Streaming Song of the Year at the 2014 Latin Billboard Music Awards.

Track listing

Charts

Weekly charts

Year-end charts

Certifications

References

2013 albums
Prince Royce albums
Sony Music Latin albums